Arturia is a genus of calcareous sponge in the family Clathrinidae which contains 14 species. It is named after Arthur Dendy, a prominent researcher of calcareous sponges. It was renamed Arturia in 2017 because the name Arthuria was already assigned to a genus of molluscs.

Description and biology
Calcinea in which the cormus comprised a typical clathroid body. A stalk may be present. The skeleton contains regular (equiangular and equiradiate) triactines and tetractines. However, tetractines are more rare. Diactines may be added. Asconoid aquiferous system.

Arturia canariensis, for example, is a filter feeder, sieving plankton and other organic material out of the current of water as it passes through the ostia. Both asexual reproduction by budding and sexual reproduction take place in Arturia canariensis. As in other species, each sponge is a hermaphrodite. Sperm is liberated into the sea and some is drawn into other sponges with the water current that passes through them. Fertilisation is then internal and the eggs are brooded in the ascon tubes of the sponge until they hatch. The free-swimming larvae are expelled through the osculi and disperse with the currents. After a few days they settle on the seabed and develop into juvenile sponges.

Species
There are 14 species in the Arturia genus.

References

 
Clathrinidae
Taxa named by Guilherme Muricy